The Bond Timber Cornwall Cricket League Premier Division is the top level of competition for recreational club cricket in Cornwall, United Kingdom and is a designated an England and Wales Cricket Board (ECB) Premier League. St Just CC are the most successful club, winning the competition in eight of its nineteen seasons. The 2021 Cornwall Premier League saw Grampound Road CC relegated and Hayle CC promoted.

History
From 1905 until 1989 there were two top divisions in Cornwall; Cornwall Senior League 1 East and Cornwall Senior League 1 West. The teams finishing in first place in the two divisions played for the Western Morning News Cup with the winner declared champions of Cornwall. The last winners of the Western Morning Cup were St Gluvias who beat St Austell by 22 runs. In 1990 the top six clubs in the east and west leagues formed County League One with St Just winning the league despite only finishing 6th in the Western league the previous season. The irony of St Just winning the first title was they were initially against an all-Cornwall league because of the increased expenditure of travel for teams in the far west.

The English Cricket Board accredited Cornwall Cricket League Premier Division was formed in 2001, with a number of changes to the format of the matches. The league was reduced from twelve to ten with each teams playing the others on three occasions. Matches now consisted of a maximum of 120 overs with the team batting first having the option of using up to 60 overs, postponed matches did not have to be replayed, and winning and losing draws were once more allowed. It was also the first time that there was a Cornwall-wide administrative body; previously the east and west leagues had separate administrators. There were a number of advantages to participating in the ECB league structure which included financial assistance of £9,500 per year and encouragement to improve facilities and coaching.

Truro were champions in the first two seasons without losing a single match, having an unbeaten run of over fifty matches. Newquay followed their promotion the previous season by becoming champions of Cornwall for the first time in 2003. St Buryan had been the runners-up in the first three seasons but decided to withdraw from the league in November 2003, due to the belief that their team would not competitive, leading to the division being reduced to nine teams. In 2004 the clubs decided to share the 110 overs per match equally and St Just won the first of their six successive championships beating Truro, the second-placed team, on the final day of the season. St Just's run came to an end in 2010 when local rivals Paul won the championship for the first time (having been runner-up three seasons previous).

Draws were once again abolished before the 2016 season.

Format
The ECB Cornwall Premier League consists of ten teams each playing the others on a home and away basis, to make a total of 18 matches each. 

The teams competing in the Premier Division for 2020 were due to be: Callington, Camborne, Grampound Road, Penzance, Redruth, St Austell, St Just, Truro, Wadebridge, and Werrington.  The 2020 competition was cancelled because of the COVID-19 pandemic.  A replacement competition was organised for the later part of the season when cricket again became possible, but with the winners not to be regarded as official league champions.

Winners

Premier Division performance by season from 2001

References

External links

 Cornwall Cricket website
 play-cricket website

21st century in Cornwall
League
ECB Premier Leagues
English domestic cricket competitions
Cricket
Sports leagues established in 2001